Baron Karl Vasilievich Ludwig von Budberg-Bönninghausen (9 July 1775–8 September 1829) was an Imperial Russian cavalry general and nobleman who participated in the Napoleonic Wars.

Early life
By birth member of the House of Budberg, German Baltic noble family, he was born in the Governorate of Livonia, as the son of Baron Ludwig Otto von Budberg-Bönninghausen (1729-1797) and his wife, Baroness Elisabeth Sophie von Löwenstern (1748-1811)

Biography
Karl Ludwig first joined the military at the age of eleven. He participated in the Italian and Swiss expedition and the Anglo-Russian invasion of Holland in 1799 and was promoted to Lieutenant Colonel by 1801.

During the War of the Fourth Coalition, von Budberg fought in the battles of Guttstadt-Deppen, Heilsberg, Friedland, and Eylau, at which he was wounded in the arm.

In 1811 he was made chief of His Majesty's Life-Guards Cuirassier Regiment, and maintained this command through the French invasion of Russia and the subsequent War of the Sixth Coalition, where he distinguished himself in numerous battles, including Borodino, Kulm, and Leipzig. He was promoted to Major General in 1813.

In 1816 von Budberg was made commander of the 2nd Brigade of the 1st Cuirassier Division, and then commander of the 2nd Hussar Division in 1824. In 1826 he was promoted to Lieutenant General and then fought in the Russo-Turkish War of 1828, during which he died of a sudden illness.

Personal life
He was married to Caroline Charlotte Jacobine Berens von Rautenfeld (1779-1839), daughter of Johann Georg Berens von Rautenfeld (1741-1805) and his wife, Elisabeth Charlotte von der Wenge genannt Lambsdorff (1749-1782). They had two daughters:
 Baroness Eveline Anna Elisabeth von Budberg-Bönninghausen (1803-1878); married to MAtthias Dietrich von der Recke (1791-1869) and had issue
 Baroness Henrietta von Budberg-Bönninghausen (d. 1847)

See also
List of Russian commanders in the Patriotic War of 1812
Baltic Germans

References

1775 births
1829 deaths
People from Kreis Riga
Baltic-German people
Imperial Russian Army generals
Russian commanders of the Napoleonic Wars
Recipients of the Order of St. George
Recipients of the Gold Sword for Bravery